James McShane (November 7, 1833 – December 14, 1918) was a Canadian businessman and politician. He was mayor of Montreal, a member of the Legislative Assembly of Quebec, and a member of the House of Commons of Canada.

Background
Born in Montreal, the son of James McShane and Ellen Quinn, he worked as an exporter of livestock to England. He served as a volunteer in the militia during the Fenian raids in 1866.

Montreal city politics
He represented the Sainte-Anne Ward on the Montreal City Council, from 1868 to 1873, 1874 to 1881 and from 1883 to 1887. From 1891 to 1893, he was the mayor of Montreal.

Member of the Provincial Legislature
In 1873, he was defeated as the Liberal Party of Quebec candidate in a Quebec provincial by-election in the riding of Montréal-Ouest.

He was elected in the 1878 provincial election and re-elected in 1881.  He was elected in Montréal-Centre in 1886, and in Montréal division no. 6 in 1890. From 1887 to 1888, he was commissioner of agriculture and public works in the cabinet of Premier Honoré Mercier. He was defeated in the 1892 provincial election.

Federal politics
In 1895, he was elected to the Canadian House of Commons in a by-election in the riding of Montreal Centre. A Liberal, he was defeated in the 1896 federal election in the riding of St. Anne.

Retirement
After leaving politics, he was involved with the Montreal Harbour Commission and was harbour-master from 1900 to 1912. After his death in 1918, he was entombed at the Notre Dame des Neiges Cemetery in Montreal.

Gallery

References

 
 
 

1833 births
1918 deaths
Businesspeople from Montreal
People of the Fenian raids
Quebec Liberal Party MNAs
Anglophone Quebec people
Canadian people of Irish descent
Quebec people of Irish descent
Liberal Party of Canada MPs
Mayors of Montreal
Members of the House of Commons of Canada from Quebec
Burials at Notre Dame des Neiges Cemetery
19th-century Canadian businesspeople